Lovington is a village and civil parish in Somerset, England, situated  south west of Castle Cary, between the River Brue and River Cary, in the South Somerset district. The parish, which includes the hamlet of Wheathill, has a population of 141.

History
The name of the village comes from Old English meaning Lufa's settlement.

There was a mill on the River Brue in the village at the time of the Domesday Book, when it was held by Serlo de Burci, however it is not certain whether this is the same site as the current Lovington Mill which was built around 1800.

The parish of Lovington was part of the hundred of Catsash, while Wheathill was part of the Whitley Hundred.

The village school was built in the early 19th century, and was helped later in the century, with donations and equipment, by the local priest and hymn writer Godfrey Thring.

Governance
The parish council has responsibility for local issues, including setting an annual precept (local rate) to cover the council's operating costs and producing annual accounts for public scrutiny. The parish council evaluates local planning applications and works with the local police, district council officers, and neighbourhood watch groups on matters of crime, security, and traffic. The parish council's role also includes initiating projects for the maintenance and repair of parish facilities, as well as consulting with the district council on the maintenance, repair, and improvement of highways, drainage, footpaths, public transport, and street cleaning. Conservation matters (including trees and listed buildings) and environmental issues are also the responsibility of the council.

The village falls within the Non-metropolitan district of South Somerset, which was formed on 1 April 1974 under the Local Government Act 1972, having previously been part of Wincanton Rural District. The district council is responsible for local planning and building control, local roads, council housing, environmental health, markets and fairs, refuse collection and recycling, cemeteries and crematoria, leisure services, parks, and tourism.

Somerset County Council is responsible for running the largest and most expensive local services such as education, social services, libraries, main roads, public transport, policing and fire services, trading standards, waste disposal and strategic planning.

It is also part of the Somerton and Frome county constituency represented in the House of Commons of the Parliament of the United Kingdom. It elects one Member of Parliament (MP) by the first past the post system of election.

Religious sites
The Anglican parish Church of St Thomas of Canterbury has 13th-century origins and was restored and enlarged in 1861. It has been designated as a Grade II* listed building. The Church of St John Baptist was converted into a private house in the 1970s.

In the 1780s Thomas Charles held the curacy of Lovington along with several other local parishes.

References

External links

Villages in South Somerset
Civil parishes in Somerset